Nathan Hines (born 29 November 1976) is an Australian-born former rugby union and rugby league footballer. He played at international level for Scotland, winning 77 caps, and at club level for Edinburgh, Perpignan, and Clermont Auvergne among others. He also played rugby league.

Early life
Hines was born in Wagga Wagga, NSW. He attended Berkeley Vale Community High School from 1989 to 1994 and was a regular feature in the school's first XIII rugby league team. He played his club football for the Berkeley Vale Panthers Junior Rugby League Club and was part of the club's first ever Premiership winning side (U/15s – defeated Woy Woy in 1991) playing alongside future NRL player Paul Stringer.

Hines attended Berkeley Vale Community High School, from 1989 to 1994 with Stringer where they played in the first XIII together. This is the same school that produced Wallaby star Adam Ashley-Cooper and Olympic marathon runner and City to Surf winner Martin Dent. Hines was also part of the Premiership winning Ourimbah Razorbacks U/19s Rugby Union side, the same club where Ashley-Cooper also played.

Club career
Hines won league and cup titles with Gala RFC, before signing for Edinburgh. He moved from Edinburgh to Perpignan in the 2005 off-season.

At the end of the 2008–09 Top 14 season, Hines chose to tour South Africa with the British & Irish Lions rather than take part in the Top 14 play-offs with Perpignan.

On 4 July 2009, it was reported in the French media that Hines would be joining 2008–09 Heineken Cup winners Leinster for the 2009–10 season. On the Lions tour, Hines played in five tour matches, but was not selected for any of the Tests against South Africa. Hines became a regular starter and a crowd favourite for Leinster, he won the 2010–11 Heineken Cup with the Irish province.

Hines signed for Clermont Auvergne in 2011. On 20 January 2014, Hines signed for Sale Sharks to compete in the English Aviva Premiership on a two-year contract from the 2014–15 season.

International career
In 2000, Hines made his Test debut for Scotland in New Zealand but two serious injuries claimed nearly 18 months of his career. He qualified to play for Scotland through his grandfather George Nairne who was from Govan. He became the first Scotland player to be sent off in a Test match when he was dismissed against the USA Eagles in 2002 for punching replacement hooker/flanker Dan Anderson. He was a big part of the Scotland squad for the 2003 Rugby World Cup, which was held in his country of birth.

In the 2005 Six Nations Championship game against Wales at Murrayfield on 13 March, Hines came on in the second half and helped restore some pride, but his try was disallowed for lack of grounding. He was alleged to be discontented with the Scotland coaches (Matt Williams and Willie Anderson) and declared his retirement from international rugby.
However, with the firing of the previous coaching regime and the appointment of his previous club coach, Frank Hadden, as Scotland coach, Hines returned to the squad. He made his reappearance as a substitute in the 2006 Six Nations win over England at Murrayfield. Hines toured South Africa with the British & Irish Lions in 2009 and featured heavily in the midweek matches but did not participate in the Tests.

On 9 November 2011 Hines announced his retirement from international rugby with immediate effect. This meant he started and ended his Scotland career at Eden Park, Auckland. Hines won a total of 77 caps and scored two tries (10 points).

Coaching career
On 6 May 2015, Hines joined the Scotland coaching staff as a Resource Coach, reuniting with his former coach Vern Cotter.

References

External links
Nathan Hines profile Sale Sharks
Nathan Hines profile Scottish Rugby
Nathan Hines profile Leinster Rugby
Nathan Hines 01Men
Hines quits and warns SRU more will follow Scotsman.com, 24 March 2005
Hines joins exodus from Fortress Scotland Times Online, 24 March 2005 
Six Nations player watch – Nathan Hines BBC Sport, 21 January 2008

1976 births
Living people
Scottish rugby union coaches
Scottish rugby union players
Scotland international rugby union players
Australian rugby union coaches
Australian rugby union players
British & Irish Lions rugby union players from Australia
British & Irish Lions rugby union players from Scotland
Rugby union locks
Rugby union players from Wagga Wagga
USA Perpignan players
Edinburgh Rugby players
Gala RFC players
Australian people of Scottish descent
Sale Sharks players